El Refugio ("The Refuge") is a municipality in the Ahuachapán department of El Salvador.

References

Municipalities of the Ahuachapán Department